This is a list of Billboard magazine's Top Hot 100 songs of 2000.

See also
2000 in music
List of Billboard Hot 100 number-one singles of 2000
List of Billboard Hot 100 top-ten singles in 2000

References

2000 record charts
Billboard charts